John Tyrrell Holmes Hare (24 November 1912 – 25 October 1976) was Bishop of Bedford from 1968 to 1976.

He was educated at Brighton College and Corpus Christi College, Oxford.  After a period of study at Ripon College Cuddesdon he was ordained in 1937 and began his career with a curacy at St Francis of Assisi, West Bromwich  followed by a period as Vicar of St Matthias, Colindale. In 1951 he began a long association with the Bedford area, being successively Rural Dean, Archdeacon of Bedford and then Suffragan Bishop.  He died in post on 25 October 1976.

Notes

1912 births
People educated at Brighton College
Alumni of Corpus Christi College, Oxford
Alumni of Ripon College Cuddesdon
Bishops of Bedford
Archdeacons of Bedford
1976 deaths